Kluky may refer to places in the Czech Republic:

Kluky (Kutná Hora District), a municipality and village in the Central Bohemian Region
Kluky (Mladá Boleslav District), a municipality and village in the Central Bohemian Region
Kluky (Písek District), a municipality and village in the South Bohemian Region

See also
Kluk (disambiguation)